The 2012 AFC Futsal Championship was held in United Arab Emirates from 25 May to 1 June 2012. 16 countries took part in the 12th edition of the tournament. It was also be the qualification event for the 2012 FIFA Futsal World Cup to be held in Thailand. The AFC Futsal Committee pushed the dates for the event forward from the original May 18 to May 25.

In its first meeting for the 2011-2015 term under the chairmanship of Guam's Richard Lai, the AFC Futsal Committee decided to award the championship to United Arab Emirates.

Qualification

Venues

Draw
The draw for the tournament was held on 11 March 2012 in United Arab Emirates.

Group stage

Group A

Group B

Group C

Group D

Knockout stage

Quarter-finals

Semi-finals

Third place play-off

Final

Awards 

 Most Valuable Player
 Rafael Henmi
 Top Scorer
 Vahid Shamsaei (7 goals and 6 assists)
 Fair-Play Award

Goalscorers
7 goals

  Ali Asghar Hassanzadeh
  Vahid Shamsaei
  Rafael Henmi
  Suphawut Thueanklang

6 goals

  Javad Asghari Moghaddam
  Mohammad Taheri
  Hossein Tayyebi

5 goals
  Apiwat Chaemcharoen

4 goals

  Kenichiro Kogure
  Tetsuya Murakami
  Abdulrahman Al-Taweel
  Kassem Kawsan
  Dilshod Irsaliev

3 goals

  Daniel Fogarty
  Hu Jie
  Hamid Ahmadi
  Mehdi Javid
  Mohammad Keshavarz
  Kotaro Inaba
  Wataru Kitahara
  Ahmad Al-Farsi
  Shaker Al-Mutairi
  Abdulrahman Al-Wadi
  Khaled Takaji
  Jirawat Sornwichian
  Kritsada Wongkaeo
  Abdulkarim Jamil

2 goals

  Fernando
  Chris Zeballos
  Chang Han
  Liu Chi-chao
  Deny Handoyo
  Ahmad Esmaeilpour
  Yusuke Komiyama
  Rashid Yousuf
  Mansur Mamedbabaev
  Alisher Ulmasov
  Farkhod Abdumavlyanov
  Dilshod Rakhmatov
  Hurshid Tajibaev
  Shuhrat Tojiboev

1 goal

  Greg Giovenali
  Andres Gomez
  Danny Ngaluafe
  Tobias Seeto
  Peter Spathis
  Cong Lin
  Deng Tao
  Zhao Liang
  Chen Po-hao
  Lo Chih-an
  Pan Wen-chieh
  Karami Balfas
  Bambang Bayu Saptaji
  Afif Tamimy
  Gustian Sukima Wardhana
  Ghodrat Bahadori
  Shota Hoshi
  Hisamitsu Kawahara
  Hamad Al-Awadhi
  Abdulrahman Al-Mosabehi
  Fawaz Haidar
  Nurjan Djetybaev
  Rustam Ermekov
  Emil Kanetov
  Vadim Kondratkov
  Karim Abou-Zeid
  Hayssam Atwi
  Ali El Homsi
  Ali Al-Sabah
  Saad Bilal
  Salem Khalifa
  Muneer Mohammed
  Amro Mohssein
  Kim Jeong-nam
  Kim Min-kuk
  Seo Dae-yun
  Orzu Dodkhudoev
  Sherzod Jumaev
  Akhtam Nazarov
  Aref Ahamah
  Jetsada Chudech
  Konghla Lakka
  Nattawut Madyalan
  Mergen Atayev
  Vatan Atayev
  Nazim Rahimov
  Tariq Abdulla
  Bader Ibrahim
  Yousif Mohamed
  Nodir Elibaev
  Oleg Khalmukhamedov
  Konstantin Sviridov

Own goals

  Yang Chao-hsun (for Tajikistan)
  Muneer Mohammed (for South Korea)
  Jeong Eui-hyun (for Iran)
  Abdulaziz Abdulla (for Kyrgyzstan)
  Konstantin Sviridov (for Kuwait)

References

External links
 Official website

AFC Futsal Championship
Afc Futsal Championship
Championship
International futsal competitions hosted by the United Arab Emirates
Afc Futsal Championship